USAir Flight 427 was a scheduled flight from Chicago's O'Hare International Airport to Palm Beach International Airport, Florida, with a stopover at Pittsburgh International Airport. On Thursday, September 8, 1994, the Boeing 737 flying this route crashed in Hopewell Township, Pennsylvania while approaching Runway 28R at Pittsburgh, which was at the time USAir's largest hub.

After the longest investigation in the history of the National Transportation Safety Board (NTSB), it was determined that the probable cause was that the aircraft's rudder malfunctioned and went hard over in a direction opposite to that commanded by the pilots, causing the plane to enter an aerodynamic stall from which the pilots were unable to recover. All 132 people on board were killed, making the crash the deadliest air disaster in Pennsylvania's history.

Involved

Aircraft
The aircraft involved was a Boeing 737-3B7, registration N513AU, and previously registered as N382AU. The aircraft was delivered in 1987 and was powered by two 
CFM56-3B2 engines. The aircraft had recorded approximately 18,800 hours of flight time before the crash.

Crew
The flight crew consisted of Captain Peter Germano, 45, who was hired by USAir in February 1981, and First Officer Charles B. "Chuck" Emmett III, 38, who was hired in February 1987 by Piedmont Airlines (which merged into USAir in 1989). Both were regarded as excellent pilots and were very experienced: Germano logged approximately 12,000 flight hours, including 4,064 on the Boeing 737, while Emmett logged 9,000 flight hours, 3,644 on the 737. Flight attendants Stanley Canty and April Slater were hired in 1989 by Piedmont Airlines. Flight attendant Sarah Slocum-Hamley was hired in October 1988 by USAir (later USAirways).

Crash

In its arrival phase approaching Pittsburgh, Flight 427 was sequenced behind Delta Air Lines Flight 1083, a Boeing 727-200.

At 19:02:57, the aircraft entered the wake turbulence of Delta 1083, and three sudden thumps, clicking sounds and a louder thump occurred, after which the 737 began to bank and roll to the left. The autopilot disconnected, and First Officer Emmett stomped on the rudder pedal, and held it there for the remainder of the flight, unaware that the rudder reversed hard to the left. As the aircraft's heading and bank angle skewed  dramatically to the left, Emmett and Germano both rolled their yokes to the right and pulled back on the elevators to counter the gradually decreasing pitch angle, as the airplane entered an aerodynamic stall, because of the wing's already high angle of attack. 

As the stick shaker activated, Germano exclaimed "Hold on!" numerous times, while Emmett, under physical exertion, said, "Oh shit!" Germano exclaimed, "What the hell is this?" As air traffic control noticed Flight 427 descending without permission, Germano keyed the mic and stated, "Four-twenty-seven, emergency!" Because the mic remained keyed for the rest of the incident, the ensuing exclamations in the cockpit were heard in the tower at Pittsburgh. The aircraft continued to roll while pitched nose-down at the ground. Trying to counteract sharply rising G-forces, Germano yelled "Pull!" three consecutive times before screaming, during which Emmett stated "God, no" seconds before impact.

Investigation 

The National Transportation Safety Board investigated the crash. All 127 passengers and five crew members were killed. For the first time in NTSB history, investigators were required to wear full-body biohazard suits while inspecting the accident site. As a result of the severity of the crash impact, the bodies of the passengers and crew were severely fragmented, leading investigators to declare the site a biohazard, requiring 2,000 body bags for the 6,000 recovered human remains. USAir had difficulty determining Flight 427's passenger list, facing confusion regarding five or six passengers. Several employees of the U.S. Department of Energy had tickets to take later flights, but used them to fly on Flight 427. One young child was not ticketed. Among the victims of the crash was noted neuroethologist Walter Heiligenberg.

Both the cockpit voice recorder (CVR) and flight data recorder (FDR) were recovered and used for the investigation. Because of the limited parameters recorded by the FDR, investigators did not have access to the position of the flight-control surfaces (rudder, ailerons, elevator, etc.) during the accident sequence. However, two parameters recorded were crucial: the aircraft's heading and the pitch-control yoke position. During the approach, Flight 427 encountered wake turbulence from Delta 1083, but the FAA determined "the wake vortex encounter alone would not have caused the continued heading change that occurred after 19:03:00." The abrupt heading change shortly before the dive pointed investigators immediately to the rudder. Without data relating to the rudder pedal positions, investigators attempted to determine whether the rudder moved hard over by a malfunction or by pilot command. The CVR was heavily scrutinized as investigators examined the pilots' words and their breathing to determine whether they were fighting for control over a rudder malfunction or had inadvertently stomped on the wrong rudder pedal in reaction to the wake turbulence. Boeing felt the latter more likely, while USAir and the pilots' union felt that the former was more likely. The FDR revealed that after the aircraft stalled, the plane and its occupants were subjected to a load as high as 4 g throughout the dive until impact with the ground in an 80-degree nose-down attitude at approximately 300 mph under significant sideslip.

Reading the control-yoke data from the FDR revealed that the pilots made a crucial error by pulling back on the yoke throughout the dive, with the stick shaker audible on the CVR from the onset of the dive. This raised the aircraft's angle of attack, removed all aileron authority, prevented recovery from the roll induced by the rudder and caused an aerodynamic stall. Because the aircraft had entered a slip, pulling back on the yoke only further aggravated the bank angle. Boeing's test pilots reenacted the dive in a simulator and in a test 737-300 by flying with the same parameters recorded by the accident FDR, and found that recovery from a fully deflected rudder at level flight, while at 190-knot crossover speed, was accomplished by turning the wheel to the opposite direction of the roll, and not pulling back on the yoke to regain aileron authority. The FAA later remarked that the CVR proved that the pilots failed to utilize proper crew resource management during the upset while continuing to apply full up elevator after receiving a stall warning. The NTSB remarked that no airline had ever trained a pilot to  properly recover from the situation experienced by the Flight 427 pilots and that the pilots had just 10 seconds from the onset of the roll to troubleshoot before recovery of the aircraft was impossible.

Investigators later discovered that the recovered accident rudder power control unit was much more sensitive to bench tests than other new such units. The exact mechanism of the failure involved the servo valve, which remains dormant and cold for much of the flight at high altitude, seizing after being injected with hot hydraulic fluid that has been in continuous action throughout the plane. This specific condition occurred in fewer than 1% of the lab tests but explained the rudder malfunction that caused Flight 427 to crash. The jam left no trace of evidence after it occurred, and a Boeing engineer later found that a jam under this controlled condition could also lead to the slide moving in the opposite direction than that commanded. Boeing felt that the test results were unrealistic and inapplicable given the extremes under which the valve was tested. It stated that the cause of the rudder reversal was more likely psychological and likened the event to a circumstance in which an automobile driver panics during an accident and accidentally presses on the gas pedal rather than the brake pedal. The FAA's official position was that sufficient probable cause did not exist to substantiate the possibility of rudder system failure.

After the longest accident investigation in NTSB history — lasting more than four and a half years — the NTSB released its final report on March 24, 1999. The NTSB concluded that the accident was the result of mechanical failure:

The NTSB concluded that similar rudder problems had caused the previously mysterious March 3, 1991 crash of United Airlines Flight 585 and the June 9, 1996 incident involving Eastwind Airlines Flight 517, both Boeing 737s. The final report also included detailed responses to Boeing's arguments about the causes of the three accidents.

Aftermath
At the time of the crash, Flight 427 was the second-deadliest accident involving a Boeing 737 (all series); as of 2022, it now ranks as the ninth deadliest. It was also the seventh-deadliest aviation disaster in the history of the United States, and the deadliest in the U.S. involving a 737; as of 2022, it ranks eleventh. The accident marked USAir's fifth crash in the period from 1989 to 1994. The Commonwealth of Pennsylvania spent approximately $500,000 in recovery and cleanup for the accident site.

The FAA disagreed with the NTSB's probable-cause verdict and Tom McSweeney, the FAA's director of aircraft certification, issued a statement on the same day on which the NTSB report was issued that read: "We believe, as much as we have studied this aircraft and this rudder system, that the actions we have taken assure a level of safety that is commensurate with any aircraft."

However, the FAA changed its attitude after a special task force, the Engineering Test and Evaluation Board, reported in July 2000 that it had detected 46 potential failures and jams in the 737 rudder system that could have catastrophic effects. In September 2000, the FAA announced that it wanted Boeing to redesign the rudder for all iterations of the 737, affecting more than 3,400 aircraft in the U.S. alone.

USAir submitted to the NTSB that pilots should receive training with regard to a plane's crossover speed and recovery from full rudder deflection. Boeing maintained that the most likely cause of the crash was that the co-pilot inadvertently deflected the rudder hard over in the wrong direction while in a panic and for unknown reasons maintained this input until impact with the ground. Boeing agreed to redesign the rudder control system with a redundant backup and paid to retrofit the entire worldwide 737 fleet. Following one of the NTSB's main recommendations, airlines were required to add four additional channels of information into flight data recorders in order to capture pilot rudder pedal commands, and the FAA set a deadline of August 2001 for airlines to comply. In 2016, former investigator John Cox stated that time has proven the NTSB correct in its findings because no additional rudder-reversal incidents have occurred since Boeing's redesign.

Following the airline's response to the Flight 427 accident, the United States Congress required airlines to deal more sensitively with the families of crash victims. USAir ceased using Flight 427 as a flight number. The crash was the second fatal USAir crash in just over two months, following the July 2 Flight 1016 accident at Charlotte-Douglas International Airport that killed 37. The crashes contributed to the financial crisis that USAir was experiencing at the time.

Memorial
The crash site itself, located near the Aliquippa exit of I-376, is located on private property. The road that is needed to access the site is accessible only to 427 Support League and Pine Creek Land Conservation Trust members. Three tombstones are located at the Sewickley Cemetery,  from the site of the crash and within the flight path of USAir 427.

Dramatization 
The episode is dramatized in the episode "Fatal Flaws" of Why Planes Crash.

See also

Similar incidents
 United Airlines Flight 585
 Eastwind Airlines Flight 517
 American Airlines Flight 1
 Northwest Airlines Flight 85
 American Airlines Flight 587
 Indonesia AirAsia Flight 8501

References

Notes

Further reading
 Adair, Bill, The Mystery of Flight 427: Inside a Crash Investigation, 
 Byrne, Gerry, Flight 427: Anatomy of an Air Disaster,

External links
 NTSB Accident Report
NTSB Accident Investigation Docket (Archive)
CVR Transcript (Archive)
FDR Transcript (Archive)
Boeing's report to the NTSB (Archive)
ALPA's report to the NTSB (Addendum) (Archive) (Addendum archive)
 
 Photos of the accident aircraft from Airliners.net
 25 years ago, USAir Flight 427 crashed near Hopewell despite perfect conditions
  Air traffic control recordings of Flight 427.

Aviation accidents and incidents in 1994
1994 in Pennsylvania
Accidents and incidents involving the Boeing 737 Classic
Airliner accidents and incidents caused by design or manufacturing errors
Airliner accidents and incidents caused by mechanical failure
Airliner accidents and incidents in Pennsylvania
Aviation accidents and incidents in the United States in 1994
Beaver County, Pennsylvania
427
September 1994 events in the United States
Aviation accidents and incidents caused by wake turbulence
Aviation accidents and incidents caused by loss of control
Pittsburgh International Airport